A corn husk doll is a Native American doll made out of the dried leaves or "husk" of a corn cob. Maize, known in some countries as corn, is a large grain plant domesticated by indigenous peoples in Mesoamerica in prehistoric times. Every part of the ear of corn was used. Women braided the husks for rope and twine and coiled them into containers and mats. Shredded husks made good kindling and filling for pillows and mattresses. The corncobs served as bottle stoppers, scrubbing brushes, and fuel for smoking meat. Corn silk made hair for corn husk dolls. Corn husk dolls have been made by Northeastern Native Americans probably since the beginnings of corn agriculture more than a thousand years ago.  Brittle dried cornhusks become soft if soaked in water and produce finished dolls sturdy enough for children's toys. Making corn husk dolls was adopted by early European settlers in the United States of America. Corn husk doll making is now practiced in the United States as a link to Native American culture and the arts and crafts of the settlers.. In other cultures, (specifically Western) corn dollies are used to celebrate Lammas. Corn dollies are magical charms thought to protect the home, livestock, and personal wellness of the maker and their family. They may be a home for the spirit of the crop. The tradition pertains to the idea that the crop of grain has a spirit that loses its home after the final harvest and it is therefore to be invited and housed in the home over the winter before being returned to the earth in spring for the next crop.

Corn husk dolls do not have faces, and there are a number of traditional explanations for this. One legend is that the Spirit of Corn, one of the Three Sisters, made a doll out of her husks to entertain children. The doll had a beautiful face, and began to spend less time with children and more time contemplating her own loveliness. As a result of her vanity, the doll's face was taken away.

See also
 Corn dolly

References

Dolls
Traditional dolls
Indigenous culture of the Northeastern Woodlands
Maize